The Ajax Attack were a Junior "A" ice hockey team from Ajax, Ontario, Canada.  They were a part of the Central Canadian Hockey League.  They used to be known as the Axemen.  In the Summer of 2010, the Attack merged with the Pickering Panthers and left Ajax.

History
The team originated as a member of the Central Junior C Hockey League in 1986.  In 1991 they made the jump to the Central Junior "B" league, despite limited success in the Central Junior "C" league, and stayed with the league in 1993 when it became the OPJHL.  Since 1987, the Attack have only had one winning season and two .500 records.

After the 2004-05 season, one of the worst seasons in OPJHL history, the Axemen changed their name to the Attack.  Despite their name change, their woes continued in 2005-06 finishing out of the playoffs in a league that allows 32 teams into their playoffs every year.  In 2006-07, the Attack managed to make the playoffs with a wildcard spot, but bowed out in the first round. In 07/08 the Attack failed to make the post season posting a 12-34-3 and again it was very frustrating year for the franchise.

Season-by-season results

Notable alumni
Brian Elliott
Matt Johnson
Mike Kostka

 Brett McConnachie
 Tyler Mcgregor

External links
Attack Website

Ontario Provincial Junior A Hockey League teams
1986 establishments in Ontario
2010 disestablishments in Ontario
Ajax, Ontario
Ice hockey clubs established in 1986
Sports clubs disestablished in 2010